In geometry, a heptagonal tiling is a regular tiling of the hyperbolic plane. It is represented by Schläfli symbol of {7,3}, having three regular heptagons around each vertex.

Images

Related polyhedra and tilings 
This tiling is topologically related as a part of sequence of regular polyhedra with Schläfli symbol {n,3}.

From a Wythoff construction there are eight hyperbolic uniform tilings that can be based from the regular heptagonal tiling. 

Drawing the tiles colored as red on the original faces, yellow at the original vertices, and blue along the original edges, there are 8 forms.

Hurwitz surfaces 

The symmetry group of the tiling is the (2,3,7) triangle group, and a fundamental domain for this action is the (2,3,7) Schwarz triangle. This is the smallest hyperbolic Schwarz triangle, and thus, by the proof of Hurwitz's automorphisms theorem, the tiling is the universal tiling that covers all Hurwitz surfaces (the Riemann surfaces with maximal symmetry group), giving them a tiling by heptagons whose symmetry group equals their automorphism group as Riemann surfaces. The smallest Hurwitz surface is the Klein quartic (genus 3, automorphism group of order 168), and the induced tiling has 24 heptagons, meeting at 56 vertices.

The dual order-7 triangular tiling has the same symmetry group, and thus yields triangulations of Hurwitz surfaces.

See also

Hexagonal tiling
Tilings of regular polygons
List of uniform planar tilings
List of regular polytopes

References

 John H. Conway, Heidi Burgiel, Chaim Goodman-Strass, The Symmetries of Things 2008,  (Chapter 19, The Hyperbolic Archimedean Tessellations)

External links 

 Hyperbolic and Spherical Tiling Gallery
 KaleidoTile 3: Educational software to create spherical, planar and hyperbolic tilings
 Hyperbolic Planar Tessellations, Don Hatch

 
Hyperbolic tilings
Isogonal tilings
Isohedral tilings
Regular tilings